The following page is an alphabetical section from the list of PC games.

B

References 

Lists of PC games